Donghu New Technology Development Zone, also referred to as Optics Valley or Guanggu, is a New Technology Development Zone in Wuhan, China. It was established in 1988. In 1991 it was approved as one of the National Economic and Technological Development Zones of China. In 2011 it was designated as a New Technology Development Zone for Optical technology, and since then self-labeled as the "Optics Valley" of China.

The Development Zone is situated east of Wuchang District in Wuhan, west of Ezhou, north of Jiangxia District, south of Donghu (East Lake).

The authority of the Development Zone has registered "Guanggu" as its trademark since 2009.

External links 
 Official Website of Donghu New Technology Development Zone

References 

Economy of Wuhan
Special Economic Zones of China
1988 establishments in China